Charles Fredrick Krause  (1873–1948) was a Major League Baseball second baseman who played for the 1901 Cincinnati Reds.  Krause played in just one major league game, playing second base and going 1-4 with a single and a pair of strikeouts in the Reds 9-3 loss to the Chicago Orphans on July 27, 1901.

External links

1873 births
1948 deaths
Major League Baseball second basemen
Cincinnati Reds players
Minneapolis Millers (baseball) players
Terre Haute Hottentots players
Decatur Commodores players
Evansville River Rats players
Lawrence Colts players
Woodstock Maroons players
Battle Creek Crickets players
Baseball players from Michigan